Erding station is a railway station on the Munich S-Bahn in the town of Erding in the northeast area of Munich, Germany. It is served by the S-Bahn line .

References

Munich S-Bahn stations
Railway stations in Bavaria
Railway stations in Germany opened in 1872
1872 establishments in Bavaria
Buildings and structures in Erding (district)